Ukuma Ta'ai (born 17 January 1987) is a Tongan professional rugby league footballer who plays as a  or  for the York Knights in the Betfred Championship and Tonga at international level.

He previously played for the New Zealand Warriors in the NRL and the Huddersfield Giants in the Super League.

Background
Ta'ai was born in Nuku'alofa, Tonga.

Early years
Ta'ai was educated at Tonga College and originally played rugby union. When he moved to Auckland, New Zealand, Ta'ai played for the University club and made the Auckland Rugby Union second XV.
The following year, at the suggestion of a friend, he switched codes and joined the Mt Albert Rugby League Club and played in the Auckland Rugby League competition. In 2008 he played for the Auckland Vulcans in the NSW Cup.

Club career

New Zealand Warriors
Ta'ai was signed by the New Zealand Warriors in 2009 and made his début in a trial game against the North Queensland Cowboys. He made his first grade début in Round Two 2009 against the Manly-Warringah Sea Eagles. Ta'ai scored the Warriors first try against Penrith on 17 April after pouncing on a loose pass and crossing under the posts. He re-signed with the Warriors for the 2012 season but was told he would be released by the club at the end of the year.

Huddersfield Giants
On 12 September 2012 Ta'ai signed with Huddersfield until 2015. His transfer was held up by red tape, until in January 2013 he was granted a British work permit. He scored his first try against Hull F.C. on 7 July 2013.

Newcastle Thunder
On 5 February 2021, it was reported that he had signed for the Newcastle Thunder in the RFL Championship.

York City Knights
On 28 September 2022, it was reported that he had signed for York in the RFL Championship.

Representative career
In 2006 Ta'ai played for Tonga in the Pacific Cup, picked from Tonga College's Under 19 rugby union team at the age of 19. The Tongan team won the tournament. He played for Tonga in the 2009 Pacific Cup.
At the conclusion of the 2015 season, Ta'ai played for Tonga in their Asia-Pacific Qualifier match against the Cook Islands for the 2017 Rugby League World Cup.

References

External links

Huddersfield Giants profile
New Zealand Warriors profile
SL profile
2017 RLWC profile

1987 births
Living people
Auckland rugby league team players
Footballers who switched code
Huddersfield Giants players
Mount Albert Lions players
New Zealand Warriors players
Newcastle Thunder players
People from Nukuʻalofa
Rugby league second-rows
Tonga national rugby league team players
Tongan emigrants to New Zealand
Tongan rugby league players
Tongan rugby union players
Tongan sportspeople
York City Knights players
Expatriate sportspeople in England